Michelle Hinn is the current chairperson of the IGDA's Game Accessibility Special Interest Group, a video game industry advocacy group for creating mainstream games accessible to gamers with disabilities. She is involved with GameAccessibility.com, a game accessibility project funded by the Bartiméus Accessibility Foundation, and is the Vice-President of the Game Division of DonationCoder.com.

Education and career
Hinn has a bachelor's degree in music performance, a bachelor's degree in psychology, and a Master of Arts degree in multimedia design from Virginia Tech.

Hinn's experience includes an internship at Microsoft Game Studios, where she focused on piloting usability tests for Xbox multiplayer games and ran playtests on Xbox games such as Halo: Combat Evolved, Oddworld: Munch's Oddysee, Fuzion Frenzy, and Amped: Freestyle Snowboarding. Additionally, she has worked for Computer Sciences Corporation, the National Center for Supercomputing Applications (NCSA), and the University of Nevada, Reno.

Hinn was an instructor in the Department of Library and Information Science at the University of Illinois at Urbana-Champaign, where she taught game design courses and was the program co-ordinator and academic advisor for the Women in Math, Science, and Engineering (WIMSE) community. In September 2006, she was named one of Next Generation'''s "100 Most Influential Women in Gaming for her work in game accessibility.

She is the co-editor of the book Visions of Quality: How Evaluators Define, Understand, and Represent Program Quality and is working with the IGDA's Game Accessibility SIG on an upcoming book. Hinn is on the editorial board of Computers in Entertainment'' magazine, and has authored several award-winning papers on the topic of universal accessibility from organizations. She was one of the three 2006 recipients of the IGDA's Most Valuable Player Award.

References

External links
 IGDA Special Interest Group site
 GameAccessibility.com
 Bartiméus Accessibility Foundation
  University of Illinois Urbana-Champaign Library and Information Science
 Women In Math, Science, and Engineering site

Human–computer interaction researchers
American educators
Women in the video game industry
Living people
Year of birth missing (living people)